Komsomolsky (masculine), Komsomolskaya (feminine), or Komsomolskoye (neuter) is the name of several inhabited localities in Russia.

Modern localities

Republic of Adygea
As of 2012, one rural locality in the Republic of Adygea bears this name:
Komsomolsky, Republic of Adygea, a settlement in Koshekhablsky District;

Altai Krai
As of 2012, four rural localities in Altai Krai bear this name:
Komsomolsky, Mamontovsky District, Altai Krai, a settlement in Komsomolsky Selsoviet of Mamontovsky District; 
Komsomolsky, Pavlovsky District, Altai Krai, a settlement in Komsomolsky Selsoviet of Pavlovsky District; 
Komsomolsky, Soloneshensky District, Altai Krai, a settlement in Karpovsky Selsoviet of Soloneshensky District; 
Komsomolsky, Topchikhinsky District, Altai Krai, a settlement in Parfenovsky Selsoviet of Topchikhinsky District;

Arkhangelsk Oblast
As of 2012, two rural localities in Arkhangelsk Oblast bear this name:
Komsomolsky, Krasnoborsky District, Arkhangelsk Oblast, a settlement in Novoshinsky Selsoviet of Krasnoborsky District
Komsomolsky, Velsky District, Arkhangelsk Oblast, a settlement in Verkhneshonoshsky Selsoviet of Velsky District

Astrakhan Oblast
As of 2012, one rural locality in Astrakhan Oblast bears this name:
Komsomolsky, Astrakhan Oblast, a settlement in Akhtubinsky Selsoviet of Krasnoyarsky District;

Republic of Bashkortostan
As of 2012, four rural localities in the Republic of Bashkortostan bear this name:
Komsomolsky, Davlekanovsky District, Republic of Bashkortostan, a selo in Rassvetovsky Selsoviet of Davlekanovsky District
Komsomolsky, Duvansky District, Republic of Bashkortostan, a village in Duvansky Selsoviet of Duvansky District
Komsomolsky, Karaidelsky District, Republic of Bashkortostan, a selo in Karayarsky Selsoviet of Karaidelsky District
Komsomolsky, Miyakinsky District, Republic of Bashkortostan, a village in Karanovsky Selsoviet of Miyakinsky District

Belgorod Oblast
As of 2012, two rural localities in Belgorod Oblast bear this name:
Komsomolsky, Belgorodsky District, Belgorod Oblast, a settlement in Belgorodsky District
Komsomolsky, Prokhorovsky District, Belgorod Oblast, a settlement in Prokhorovsky District

Republic of Buryatia
As of 2012, one rural locality in the Republic of Buryatia bears this name:
Komsomolskoye, Republic of Buryatia, a selo in Komsomolsky Selsoviet of Yeravninsky District

Chechen Republic
As of 2012, two rural localities in the Chechen Republic bear this name:
Komsomolskoye, Groznensky District, Chechen Republic, a selo in Komsomolskaya Rural Administration of Groznensky District
Komsomolskoye, Gudermessky District, Chechen Republic, a selo in Komsomolskaya Rural Administration of Gudermessky District

Chelyabinsk Oblast
As of 2012, five rural localities in Chelyabinsk Oblast bear this name:
Komsomolsky, Argayashsky District, Chelyabinsk Oblast, a settlement in Khudayberdinsky Selsoviet of Argayashsky District
Komsomolsky, Bredinsky District, Chelyabinsk Oblast, a settlement in Komsomolsky Selsoviet of Bredinsky District
Komsomolsky, Kizilsky District, Chelyabinsk Oblast, a settlement in Granitny Selsoviet of Kizilsky District
Komsomolsky, Varnensky District, Chelyabinsk Oblast, a settlement in Kateninsky Selsoviet of Varnensky District
Komsomolskoye, Chelyabinsk Oblast, a selo in Petropavlovsky Selsoviet of Verkhneuralsky District

Chukotka Autonomous Okrug
As of 2012, one urban locality in Chukotka Autonomous Okrug bears this name:
Komsomolsky, Chukotka Autonomous Okrug, an urban-type settlement in Chaunsky District

Chuvash Republic
As of 2012, one rural locality in the Chuvash Republic bears this name:
Komsomolskoye, Chuvash Republic, a selo in Komsomolskoye Rural Settlement of Komsomolsky District

Republic of Dagestan
As of 2012, two inhabited localities in the Republic of Dagestan bear this name:

Urban localities
Komsomolsky, Republic of Dagestan, a settlement under the administrative jurisdiction of the Town of Kizlyar; 

Rural localities
Komsomolskoye, Republic of Dagestan, a selo in Kizilyurtovsky District;

Kabardino-Balkar Republic
As of 2012, one rural locality in the Kabardino-Balkar Republic bears this name:
Komsomolskoye, Kabardino-Balkar Republic (or Komsomolsky), a selo in Prokhladnensky District;

Republic of Kalmykia
As of 2012, one rural locality in the Republic of Kalmykia bears this name:
Komsomolsky, Republic of Kalmykia, a settlement in Komsomolskaya Rural Administration of Chernozemelsky District;

Kemerovo Oblast
As of 2012, one rural locality in Kemerovo Oblast bears this name:
Komsomolsky, Kemerovo Oblast, a settlement in Shishinskaya Rural Territory of Topkinsky District;

Khanty-Mansi Autonomous Okrug
As of 2012, one rural locality in Khanty-Mansi Autonomous Okrug bears this name:
Komsomolsky, Khanty-Mansi Autonomous Okrug, a settlement in Oktyabrsky District

Kirov Oblast
As of 2012, one rural locality in Kirov Oblast bears this name:
Komsomolsky, Kirov Oblast, a settlement in Komsomolsky Rural Okrug of Kotelnichsky District;

Komi Republic
As of 2012, one urban locality in the Komi Republic bears this name:
Komsomolsky, Komi Republic (or Komsomolskaya), an urban-type settlement incorporated as an Urban-Type Settlement Administrative Territory under the administrative jurisdiction of the town of republic significance of Vorkuta;

Krasnodar Krai
As of 2012, eight rural localities in Krasnodar Krai bear this name:
Komsomolsky, Belorechensky District, Krasnodar Krai, a settlement in Pervomaysky Rural Okrug of Belorechensky District; 
Komsomolsky, Gulkevichsky District, Krasnodar Krai, a settlement in Komsomolsky Rural Okrug of Gulkevichsky District; 
Komsomolsky, Kavkazsky District, Krasnodar Krai, a settlement in Mirskoy Rural Okrug of Kavkazsky District; 
Komsomolsky, Korenovsky District, Krasnodar Krai, a settlement in Novoberezansky Rural Okrug of Korenovsky District; 
Komsomolsky, Kurganinsky District, Krasnodar Krai, a settlement in Oktyabrsky Rural Okrug of Kurganinsky District; 
Komsomolsky, Kushchyovsky District, Krasnodar Krai, a settlement in Pervomaysky Rural Okrug of Kushchyovsky District; 
Komsomolsky, Novokubansky District, Krasnodar Krai, a settlement in Kovalevsky Rural Okrug of Novokubansky District; 
Komsomolsky, Timashyovsky District, Krasnodar Krai, a settlement in Poselkovy Rural Okrug of Timashyovsky District;

Krasnoyarsk Krai
As of 2012, one rural locality in Krasnoyarsk Krai bears this name:
Komsomolsky, Krasnoyarsk Krai, a settlement in Bolshesalbinsky Selsoviet of Idrinsky District

Kurgan Oblast
As of 2012, three rural localities in Kurgan Oblast bear this name:
Komsomolskaya, Kargapolsky District, Kurgan Oblast, a village in Maysky Selsoviet of Kargapolsky District; 
Komsomolskaya, Shadrinsky District, Kurgan Oblast, a village in Baturinsky Selsoviet of Shadrinsky District; 
Komsomolskaya, Zverinogolovsky District, Kurgan Oblast, a village in Kruglyansky Selsoviet of Zverinogolovsky District;

Kursk Oblast
As of 2012, one rural locality in Kursk Oblast bears this name:
Komsomolsky, Kursk Oblast, a settlement in Yaryginsky Selsoviet of Pristensky District

Leningrad Oblast
As of 2012, one rural locality in Leningrad Oblast bears this name:
Komsomolskoye, Leningrad Oblast, a settlement under the administrative jurisdiction of Kamennogorskoye Settlement Municipal Formation in Vyborgsky District;

Mari El Republic
As of 2012, two rural localities in the Mari El Republic bear this name:
Komsomolsky, Morkinsky District, Mari El Republic, a settlement in Korkatovsky Rural Okrug of Morkinsky District; 
Komsomolsky, Sovetsky District, Mari El Republic, a settlement in Verkh-Ushnursky Rural Okrug of Sovetsky District;

Republic of Mordovia
As of 2012, one urban locality in the Republic of Mordovia bears this name:
Komsomolsky, Republic of Mordovia, a work settlement in Chamzinsky District;

Nizhny Novgorod Oblast
As of 2012, two rural localities in Nizhny Novgorod Oblast bear this name:
Komsomolsky, Shakhunya, Nizhny Novgorod Oblast, a settlement in Luzhaysky Selsoviet under the administrative jurisdiction of the town of oblast significance of Shakhunya
Komsomolsky, Bogorodsky District, Nizhny Novgorod Oblast, a settlement in Kamensky Selsoviet of Bogorodsky District

Republic of North Ossetia–Alania
As of 2012, one rural locality in the Republic of North Ossetia–Alania bears this name:
Komsomolskoye, Republic of North Ossetia–Alania, a selo in Komsomolsky Rural Okrug of Kirovsky District

Novosibirsk Oblast
As of 2012, one rural locality in Novosibirsk Oblast bears this name:
Komsomolsky, Novosibirsk Oblast, a settlement in Kuybyshevsky District

Omsk Oblast
As of 2012, two rural localities in Omsk Oblast bear this name:
Komsomolsky, Omsk Oblast, a settlement in Lesnoy Rural Okrug of Isilkulsky District
Komsomolskoye, Omsk Oblast, a village in Borisovsky Rural Okrug of Sherbakulsky District

Orenburg Oblast
As of 2012, four rural localities in Orenburg Oblast bear this name:
Komsomolsky, Adamovsky District, Orenburg Oblast, a settlement in Komsomolsky Selsoviet of Adamovsky District
Komsomolsky, Alexandrovsky District, Orenburg Oblast, a settlement in Yafarovsky Selsoviet of Alexandrovsky District
Komsomolsky, Grachyovsky District, Orenburg Oblast, a settlement in Tallinsky Selsoviet of Grachyovsky District
Komsomolsky, Kvarkensky District, Orenburg Oblast, a settlement in Briyentsky Selsoviet of Kvarkensky District

Oryol Oblast
As of 2012, one rural locality in Oryol Oblast bears this name:
Komsomolsky, Oryol Oblast, a settlement in Kozminsky Selsoviet of Livensky District

Perm Krai
As of 2012, two rural localities in Perm Krai bear this name:
Komsomolsky, Kungursky District, Perm Krai, a settlement in Kungursky District
Komsomolsky, Yurlinsky District, Perm Krai, a settlement in Yurlinsky District

Rostov Oblast
As of 2012, three rural localities in Rostov Oblast bear this name:
Komsomolsky, Kasharsky District, Rostov Oblast, a settlement in Fomino-Svechnikovskoye Rural Settlement of Kasharsky District
Komsomolsky, Morozovsky District, Rostov Oblast, a settlement in Shiroko-Atamanovskoye Rural Settlement of Morozovsky District
Komsomolsky, Zernogradsky District, Rostov Oblast, a settlement under the administrative jurisdiction of Zernogradskoye Urban Settlement in Zernogradsky District

Ryazan Oblast
As of 2012, one rural locality in Ryazan Oblast bears this name:
Komsomolsky, Ryazan Oblast, a settlement in Pionersky Rural Okrug of Rybnovsky District

Samara Oblast
As of 2012, two rural localities in Samara Oblast bear this name:
Komsomolsky, Borsky District, Samara Oblast, a settlement in Borsky District
Komsomolsky, Kinelsky District, Samara Oblast, a settlement in Kinelsky District

Saratov Oblast
As of 2012, seven rural localities in Saratov Oblast bear this name:
Komsomolsky, Bazarno-Karabulaksky District, Saratov Oblast, a settlement in Bazarno-Karabulaksky District
Komsomolsky, Dergachyovsky District, Saratov Oblast, a settlement in Dergachyovsky District
Komsomolsky, Ozinsky District, Saratov Oblast, a khutor in Ozinsky District
Komsomolsky, Petrovsky District, Saratov Oblast, a settlement in Petrovsky District
Komsomolskoye, Arkadaksky District, Saratov Oblast, a settlement in Arkadaksky District
Komsomolskoye, Balakovsky District, Saratov Oblast, a selo in Balakovsky District
Komsomolskoye, Krasnokutsky District, Saratov Oblast, a selo in Krasnokutsky District

Sverdlovsk Oblast
As of 2012, one rural locality in Sverdlovsk Oblast bears this name:
Komsomolsky, Sverdlovsk Oblast, a settlement in Chupinsky Selsoviet of Talitsky District

Tula Oblast
As of 2012, two rural localities in Tula Oblast bear this name:
Komsomolsky, Kireyevsky District, Tula Oblast, a settlement under the administrative jurisdiction of Lipki Town Under District Jurisdiction in Kireyevsky District
Komsomolsky, Uzlovsky District, Tula Oblast, a settlement in Partizanskaya Rural Administration of Uzlovsky District

Tver Oblast
As of 2012, two rural localities in Tver Oblast bear this name:
Komsomolsky, Firovsky District, Tver Oblast, a settlement in Rozhdestvenskoye Rural Settlement of Firovsky District
Komsomolsky, Kalininsky District, Tver Oblast, a settlement in Verkhnevolzhskoye Rural Settlement of Kalininsky District

Tyumen Oblast
As of 2012, four rural localities in Tyumen Oblast bear this name:
Komsomolsky, Golyshmanovsky District, Tyumen Oblast, a settlement in Khmelevsky Rural Okrug of Golyshmanovsky District
Komsomolsky, Vagaysky District, Tyumen Oblast, a settlement in Pervomaysky Rural Okrug of Vagaysky District
Komsomolsky, Zavodoukovsky District, Tyumen Oblast, a settlement in Zavodoukovsky District
Komsomolskaya, Tyumen Oblast, a village in Desyatovsky Rural Okrug of Ishimsky District

Volgograd Oblast
As of 2012, three rural localities in Volgograd Oblast bear this name:
Komsomolsky, Kalachyovsky District, Volgograd Oblast, a settlement in Sovetsky Selsoviet of Kalachyovsky District
Komsomolsky, Novonikolayevsky District, Volgograd Oblast, a settlement in Komsomolsky Selsoviet of Novonikolayevsky District
Komsomolsky, Pallasovsky District, Volgograd Oblast, a settlement in Komsomolsky Selsoviet of Pallasovsky District

Vologda Oblast
As of 2012, one rural locality in Vologda Oblast bears this name:
Komsomolsky, Vologda Oblast, a settlement in Minkovsky Selsoviet of Babushkinsky District

Voronezh Oblast
As of 2012, five rural localities in Voronezh Oblast bear this name:
Komsomolsky, Buturlinovsky District, Voronezh Oblast, a settlement under the administrative jurisdiction of Nizhnekislyayskoye Urban Settlement in Buturlinovsky District
Komsomolsky, Ramonsky District, Voronezh Oblast, a settlement in Komsomolskoye Rural Settlement of Ramonsky District
Komsomolsky, Talovsky District, Voronezh Oblast, a settlement in Alexandrovskoye Rural Settlement of Talovsky District
Komsomolskoye, Ertilsky District, Voronezh Oblast, a settlement in Pervomayskoye Rural Settlement of Ertilsky District
Komsomolskoye, Olkhovatsky District, Voronezh Oblast, a settlement in Lisichanskoye Rural Settlement of Olkhovatsky District

Zabaykalsky Krai
As of 2012, one rural locality in Zabaykalsky Krai bears this name:
Komsomolskoye, Zabaykalsky Krai, a selo in Chernyshevsky District

Renamed localities
Komsomolsky, name of the town of Yugorsk in Khanty–Mansi Autonomous Okrug before 1992
Komsomolskoye, name of 3-go otdeleniya plemsovkhoza "Pobeda Oktyabrya", a settlement in Martynovskoye Rural Settlement of Paninsky District in Voronezh Oblast, before March 2013

Alternative names
Komsomolsky, alternative name of Komsomolets, a settlement in Krasnoarmeysky Rural Okrug of Yeysky District in Krasnodar Krai; 
Komsomolskaya, alternative name of Prikumsky, a settlement in Prikumskaya Rural Administration of Chernozemelsky District in the Republic of Kalmykia; 
Komsomolskaya, alternative name of Molodyozhny, a settlement in Chernigovsky Rural Okrug of Belorechensky District in Krasnodar Krai;